Leel Kalan is a village in Batala in Gurdaspur district of Punjab State, India. The village is administrated by Sarpanch an elected representative of the village.

Demography 
, the village had a total number of 453 houses and a population of 2531, of which 1280 were males and 1251 were females.  According to the report published by Census India in 2011, out of the total population of the village 740 people were from Schedule Caste and the village does not have any Schedule Tribe population so far.

See also
List of villages in India

References

External links 
 Tourism of Punjab
 Census of Punjab

Villages in Gurdaspur district